Jean Kiritsho Kasusula (born 5 August 1982) is a Congolese politician and former professional footballer who played as a left-back.

In May 2015, it was announced that Kasusula and ex-teammate Robert Kidiaba would stand for the National Party for Democracy and Development at forthcoming elections.

Club career
Kasusula amassed 250 appearances for TP Mazembe from 2004 to 2020 and helped them win three CAF Champions Leagues. He scored at the 2009 FIFA Club World Cup.

International career
Kasusula played for the DR Congo national team from 2011 to 2015, appearing 41 times without scoring. He played at the 2013 and 2015 Africa Cup of Nations, the latter of which DR Congo finished third.

Honours
DR Congo
Africa Cup of Nations: third place 2015

References

1982 births
Living people
People from Kisangani
Democratic Republic of the Congo footballers
Democratic Republic of the Congo international footballers
Association football defenders
TP Mazembe players
2011 African Nations Championship players
2013 Africa Cup of Nations players
2015 Africa Cup of Nations players
21st-century Democratic Republic of the Congo people
Democratic Republic of the Congo A' international footballers